Urtica fissa is an upright perennial herb native to streams and rainforest of China.

It is monoecious, has both sex organs, and rarely has only one sex organ (dioecious)

Growth

References

fissa
Flora of China